Jesús Emiliano Trindade Flores (born 10 July 1993) is a Uruguayan professional footballer who plays as a midfielder for Coritiba, on loan from Pachuca.

Career
A youth academy graduate of Racing Club Montevideo, Trindade made his professional debut on 24 November 2012 in a 2–0 league defeat against Nacional. He joined Peñarol prior to the 2019 season.

Honours
Peñarol
 Uruguayan Primera División: 2021

References

External links
 
Profile at ESPN FC

1993 births
Living people
Footballers from Salto, Uruguay
Association football midfielders
Uruguayan footballers
Uruguayan Primera División players
Liga MX players
Campeonato Brasileiro Série A players
Racing Club de Montevideo players
Peñarol players
C.F. Pachuca players
Coritiba Foot Ball Club players
Uruguayan expatriate sportspeople in Mexico
Expatriate footballers in Mexico
Uruguayan expatriate sportspeople in Brazil
Expatriate footballers in Brazil